Julian Dzeko (born May 3, 1992), known mononymously as Dzeko, is a Canadian DJ and record producer. Known as a former member of the DJ duo Dzeko & Torres, he left the group to pursue a solo career in 2016.

Dzeko released "Liberty" as a single on December 12, 2016, as well as "Never Gonna Love Me" on February 2, 2017 on Armada Deep. He has also put up remixes on his SoundCloud page for the songs "Paris" and "Something Just Like This" by The Chainsmokers and "Congratulations" and "Circles" by Post Malone. On December 8, 2017, Dzeko was invited by the Harvard College Electronic Music Collective to lecture on the state of the music industry.

In 2018, Dzeko collaborated with Dutch DJ Tiësto alongside featured guests Preme and Post Malone, to release the single "Jackie Chan".

Personal life
Dzeko is the older brother of Canadian actress Eliana Jones.

Discography

Charted singles

Singles

Remixes

References

Canadian DJs
Canadian electronic musicians
Living people
1992 births
Musicians from Toronto
Electronic dance music DJs
Remixers
Stmpd Rcrds artists